Epigraphy is the study of inscriptions, or epigraphs, as writing; it is the science of identifying graphemes, clarifying their meanings, classifying their uses according to dates and cultural contexts, and drawing conclusions about the writing and the writers. Specifically excluded from epigraphy are the historical significance of an epigraph as a document and the artistic value of a literary composition.  A person using the methods of epigraphy is called an epigrapher or epigraphist. For example, the Behistun inscription is an official document of the Achaemenid Empire engraved on native rock at a location in Iran. Epigraphists are responsible for reconstructing, translating, and dating the trilingual inscription and finding any relevant circumstances. It is the work of historians, however, to determine and interpret the events recorded by the inscription as document. Often, epigraphy and history are competences practised by the same person.  Epigraphy is a primary tool of archaeology when dealing with literate cultures. The US Library of Congress classifies epigraphy as one of the auxiliary sciences of history. Epigraphy also helps identify a forgery: epigraphic evidence formed part of the discussion concerning the James Ossuary.

An epigraph (not to be confused with epigram) is any sort of text, from a single grapheme (such as marks on a pot that abbreviate the name of the merchant who shipped commodities in the pot) to a lengthy document (such as a treatise, a work of literature, or a hagiographic inscription). Epigraphy overlaps other competences such as numismatics or palaeography. When compared to books, most inscriptions are short. The media and the forms of the graphemes are diverse: engravings in stone or metal, scratches on rock, impressions in wax, embossing on cast metal, cameo or intaglio on precious stones, painting on ceramic or in fresco. Typically the material is durable, but the durability might be an accident of circumstance, such as the baking of a clay tablet in a conflagration.

The character of the writing, the subject of epigraphy, is a matter quite separate from the nature of the text, which is studied in itself. Texts inscribed in stone are usually for public view and so they are essentially different from the written texts of each culture.  Not all inscribed texts are public, however: in Mycenaean Greece the deciphered texts of "Linear B" were revealed to be largely used for economic and administrative record keeping. Informal inscribed texts are "graffiti" in its original sense.

The study of ideographic inscriptions, that is inscriptions representing an idea or concept, may also be called ideography. The German equivalent Sinnbildforschung was a scientific discipline in the Third Reich, but was later dismissed as being highly ideological. Epigraphic research overlaps with the study of petroglyphs, which deals with specimens of pictographic, ideographic and logographic writing.  The study of ancient handwriting, usually in ink, is a separate field, palaeography. Epigraphy also differs from iconography, as it confines itself to meaningful symbols containing messages, rather than dealing with images.

History

The science of epigraphy has been developing steadily since the 16th century. Principles of epigraphy vary culture by culture, and the infant science in European hands concentrated on Latin inscriptions at first. Individual contributions have been made by epigraphers such as Georg Fabricius (1516–1571); Stefano Antonio Morcelli (1737–1822); Luigi Gaetano Marini (1742–1815); August Wilhelm Zumpt (1815–1877); Theodor Mommsen (1817–1903); Emil Hübner (1834–1901); Franz Cumont (1868–1947); Louis Robert (1904–1985).

The , begun by Mommsen and other scholars, has been published in Berlin since 1863, with wartime interruptions. It is the largest and most extensive collection of Latin inscriptions. New fascicles are still produced as the recovery of inscriptions continues. The  is arranged geographically: all inscriptions from Rome are contained in volume 6. This volume has the greatest number of inscriptions; volume 6, part 8, fascicle 3 was just recently published (2000). Specialists depend on such on-going series of volumes in which newly discovered inscriptions are published, often in Latin, not unlike the biologists' Zoological Record – the raw material of history.

Greek epigraphy has unfolded in the hands of a different team, with different corpora. There are two. This marked a first attempt at a comprehensive publication of Greek inscriptions copied from all over the Greek-speaking world. Only advanced students still consult it, for better editions of the texts have superseded it. The second, modern corpus is  arranged geographically under categories: decrees, catalogues, honorary titles, funeral inscriptions, various, all presented in Latin, to preserve the international neutrality of the field of classics.

Egyptian hieroglyphs were solved using the Rosetta Stone, which was a multilingual stele in Classical Greek, Demotic Egyptian and Classical Egyptian hieroglyphs. The work was done by the French scholar, Jean-François Champollion, and the British scientist Thomas Young.

The interpretation of Maya hieroglyphs was lost as a result of the Spanish Conquest of Central America. However, recent work by Maya epigraphers and linguists has yielded a considerable amount of information on this complex writing system.

Form

Materials and technique

Materials
Inscriptions were commonly incised on stone, marble, metal, terracotta, or wood (though this last material has hardly ever survived, except in Egypt). In Egypt and Mesopotamia hard stones were frequently used for the purpose, and the inscriptions are therefore well preserved and easy to read. In Greece the favourite material, especially in Athens, was white marble, which takes an admirably clear lettering, but is liable to weathering of the surface if exposed, and to wear if rebuilt into pavements or similar structures. Many other kinds of stone, both hard and soft, were often used, especially crystalline limestones, which do not easily take a smooth surface, and which, therefore, are often difficult to decipher, owing to accidental marks or roughness of the material.

The metal most commonly used for inscriptions was bronze: flat tablets of this were often made for affixing to the walls of temples and other buildings. Occasionally such tablets were made of silver or gold; and inscriptions were often incised on vessels made of any of these metals. Inscriptions on metal were nearly always incised, not cast. An important class of inscriptions are the legends on coins; these were struck from the die. (cf. numismatics.) Clay was very extensively used for inscriptions in Mesopotamia and in Crete. In this case the symbols were incised or impressed on specially prepared tablets when the clay was soft, and it was subsequently hardened by fire. In Greece, many inscriptions on vases were painted before firing, in that case often having reference to the scenes represented, or incised after firing; potsherds (ostraka) were often used as a cheap writing material. Inscriptions were also often impressed from a mould upon wet clay before firing, in the case of tiles, amphora handles, etc., and in these cases often supply valuable information as to the buildings to which they belong or the place from which they took their origin.

The tools used for making inscriptions varied with the material; most of them were some kind of chisel, usually with a square blade; early inscriptions were sometimes made on hard rock by successive blows with a punch or pointed hammer. Sometimes a circular punch was used for O or a letter of which O formed a part.

Styles of cutting
Early inscriptions, which are often amateur work, are frequently very irregular in their cutting. But in almost all examples of later work, the inscriptions are evidently cut by professionals, and there are definite styles and methods belonging to various places and periods. In Egypt, for instance, the hieroglyphs are carefully and delicately cut in early times, and in later periods become more careless and conventional. In Greece, the best work was done in the 5th and 4th centuries BC in Athens; the letters were all exact and regular in shape, with no adventitious ornaments, and were, especially in the 5th century, usually exactly aligned with the letters above and below, as well as those on each side. At that time all the strokes were made of equal thickness, but in the 4th century BC and later there came in the custom of holding the chisel obliquely to the surface, thus producing a wedge-shaped stroke. A similar custom in Mesopotamia gave rise to the so-called cuneiform system. On metal inscriptions in Greece this same effect appears earlier than stone or marble. In the 3rd century and later it becomes common to introduce apices or ornamental ends to the strokes, a custom which prevails to the present day in our ordinary capital letters. The custom of making different strokes and different parts of curves of varying thickness became common in Roman inscriptions, which developed a monumental style of their own, varying from period to period. Inscriptions can often be approximately dated by the style of the cutting as well as by the shapes of the letters; skill in doing this can only be acquired by a careful and minute study of originals and facsimiles. (cf. dating methodologies in archaeology.)

Inscriptions vary greatly in size according to the position where they were intended to be read, their purpose, and the skill of the cutter. Some inscriptions are of great length, the longest, a statement of accounts of the temple at Delos, under Athenian administration, being nearly half as long as a book of Thucydides; and many other inscriptions approach this in length.

Symbols and forms of writing

Most of the forms of writing known to us originated in some system of picture-writing (cf. also pictography, which developed into a hieroglyphic system. Such systems appear to have originated independently in different parts of the world – in Egypt, Mesopotamia, Crete, among the Hittites and in China and America. The evidence for all of these is mainly to be found in inscriptions. The development from Ideographs (or direct representation of an object or idea) to symbols of phonetic value, and so to syllabaries or alphabets, took place in many different systems to various degrees. But the first people to invent a completely alphabetic system of writing were the Phoenicians, from whom the Greeks borrowed (some scholars believe, but with no proving) it with certain modifications and improvements. From the Greeks was derived the Latin, and from the two all the alphabets of European peoples. It is still a matter of dispute whether the Phoenician was derived from the Egyptian.

The hieroglyphic symbols naturally tended to be conventionalised and simplified for convenience of cutting, in accordance with the materials and tools employed. In many cases they developed from a pictorial to a linear form. It is possible that some of these linear forms may not be derived from hieroglyphs, but from purely conventional geometrical forms, such as widely used at all periods and places as owners' or masons' marks. The tendency of linear forms to become wedge-shaped is most conspicuous in cuneiform, but as has been noticed, the same tendency occurs in Greek inscriptions incised on bronze.

In the north of Europe the Ogham inscriptions are alphabetic, and are apparently an independent invention on arbitrary lines, like the Morse code; but Runes, which were extensively used in the same region, are derived from the Greek or the Latin alphabets.

In most alphabetic systems there are also found in inscriptions certain symbols which are not strictly alphabetic or phonetic in character. The commonest of these are the various systems of numerals that are used in different times and places. It is impossible here to give any full description of these different systems; but a brief account may be given of the principles underlying them. Most of them are based upon a decimal system, doubtless owing to the habit of counting on the fingers. In some cases the symbols are simple and obvious, as in the Cretan script, where circles (or rhombi), dots and lines are used for hundreds, tens and units, each being repeated as often as necessary; and a similar system for the lower denominations is used at Epidaurus in the 4th century BC. The other Greek system followed that derived from the Phoenicians, using the letters of the alphabet in their conventional order from one to nine, 10 to 90 and 100 to 900; in this arrangement obsolete letters were retained in their original places so as to give the requisite number of 27 symbols. The Roman system of numerals – M, D, C, L, X, V, I (for 1,000, 500, 100, 50, 10, 5 and 1) is generally supposed to have arisen from the adaptation of those symbols in the Greek alphabet which the Romans did not want; an alternative theory is that it is simplified from a series of ideographs representing the spread hand, the fingers and so on.

Apart from numerals, the use of initials in the place of complete words was not common in early times. It became, however, very frequent in Roman inscriptions, which sometimes are made up almost entirely of such abbreviations and can only be understood by those familiar with the formulae. A list of the commonest of these will be found under list of classical abbreviations. Compendia or monograms also occur in later Greek and Roman times, and become very common and very difficult to interpret in early Christian and Byzantine inscriptions.

Some kind of punctuation is often found in inscriptions of all kinds. In Greek inscriptions a vertical line or a dot, or dots, sometimes indicates the separation between sentences or words, but words are seldom separated by spaces as in modern printing, so that the text is continuous and no division of words exists. This is particularly the case with Greek inscriptions of the best period. In Roman inscriptions it was usual to separate the words by dots. In certain inscriptions a cross was used to indicate the beginning of an inscription, especially when its direction was erratic. Christian inscriptions sometimes begin with a cross, which doubtless had a symbolic meaning; and a leaf or other device was often placed at the end.

The direction of the writing varies greatly in different places and times. The letters or symbols may be arranged vertically below one another, and read from top to bottom, or horizontally, either from right to left or from left to right; they may also be arranged in a kind of pattern – in which case their order may be indeterminate, or in a wandering or curved line, or left to right and right to left alternately (boustrophedon, or as an ox in ploughing). Most Semitic alphabets, including Phoenician, read from right to left; and the earliest Greek inscriptions follow the same direction. But the direction from left to right became regular in Greece after the 6th century BC, and consequently is adopted by the Romans and in all European systems. The individual letters or symbols usually face in the same direction as the writing, as a whole.

Position or place

The position or place of inscriptions depends greatly upon their purpose or intention. When they have a direct relation to the sculptures, reliefs or paintings with which they are associated, they often form a kind of pattern to fill the background or vacant spaces between the figures; but sometimes, especially in Mesopotamian statues or reliefs, they are cut right across the figures without any regard to the artistic effect. In late Greek or Roman work it is usual to cut any inscription relative to a statue or relief upon the basis on which this is mounted; but short inscriptions such as dedications or artists' signatures are often placed in some inconspicuous position upon the work itself. In the case of painted vases, the inscriptions relative to the subject represented are usually painted; but dedications and other inscriptions are often incised after the vase has been fired.

In Egypt, inscriptions were often inscribed or painted upon inner walls of tombs, whether they referred to religious belief or ritual, or to the honours and possessions of the deceased; they were intended for his benefit and convenience rather than for the information of others, so as to perpetuate his familiar surroundings, not to make him live in the memory of his successors. The information which we derive from such inscriptions is invaluable to us; but such was not the intention with which they were made. On the other hand, inscriptions which were intended to be seen by the public and to perpetuate a record of events, or to supply useful information, were usually placed in places of common resort, above all in temples and sacred precincts. Sometimes they were cut on convenient rock faces, sometimes upon the walls of temples or other buildings. Most frequently the slabs of marble (stelae), stone metal or other material upon which the inscriptions were incised were set up in convenient positions to be read, in any places of public resort. This was the method of publication of all laws, decrees and official notices, of treaties and contracts, of honours to officials or private citizens, of religious dedications and prescriptions of ritual. Inscribed tombstones were set up over graves, which were usually placed along the chief roads leading out of a town, the most familiar example being the sacred way from Athens to Eleusis. Inscriptions commemorative of victories or other great events were only in exceptional cases erected upon the spot; more often such memorials were set up in some great religious centre such as Delphi or Olympia. But boundary stones were necessarily placed on the line which they defined.

Chief periods and nationalities

The study of inscriptions supplies an important contribution to the history of many lands and peoples. In some cases, as in Egypt and Mesopotamia, it forms almost the only source of information in the absence of literary records; in others, as in Greece and Rome, it offers a most valuable supplement and comment to what is otherwise recorded.

Both Egyptian and Mesopotamian inscriptions go back to an extremely early date; it is at present uncertain which is the earlier, but both show, before 3500 BC and possibly much earlier, a complete, organised system of writing which implies many centuries of development behind it. The Egyptian hieroglyphic system, as used in inscriptions, continued without any essential change of character until Roman times, though various systems of hieratic modification were used at different times. On the famous Rosetta Stone, in the British Museum, which first gave the clue to the interpretation of Egyptian writing, hieroglyphic, hieratic and Greek versions of the same decree are given side by side. Its date is 195 BC. The Mesopotamian linear symbols developed mainly for technical reasons, into a wedge-shaped or cuneiform system, which was adopted in modified forms and applied to different languages through some thousands of years, Sumerian, Babylonian, Assyrian and Persian, until it was superseded, after the conquests of Alexander, by Greek. An independent hieroglyphic system, which also developed into various linear scripts, existed in Crete during the Middle and Late Minoan periods, from about 3000, probably, to the fall of Knossos, about 1500 BC. The Hittite hieroglyphs correspond to the period of the Hittite empire in northern Syria and Asia Minor from about 2000 to 800 BC; from it, according to one theory, arose the Cypriot syllabary, which continued in use until the 4th century BC or later.

The earliest Phoenician inscriptions known date from about the 10th century BC, and the alphabet remained in use down to the 3rd century BC. Some believe this was modified and adopted by the Greeks at an uncertain date; the earliest Greek inscriptions are generally dated in the 7th century BC.

In early times each Greek State had its own alphabet; but in the year 403 BC (the archonship of Eucleides) the Ionian alphabet, which is the one used now for Greek capital letters, was officially adopted by Athens, and soon became universal in Greece. From the various Greek alphabets the different local Italian alphabets, including the Etruscan, were derived with various modifications. The Roman alphabet was among these, being based on the alphabet of Caere, a Chalcidian colony. There are a few very early Roman inscriptions; but they do not become common until the 3rd century BC; from that time the letters took much the same forms as they preserve to the present day.

The custom of putting inscriptions in Greek and in Latin on buildings and other monuments continued through medieval times, and is still customary, classical forms being frequently imitated. The latest dated inscription in the Greek Corpus records the building of a bridge in Sicily in AD 1121. The series of Byzantine inscriptions continues practically without interruption to the present day; and Latin retains its use as a universal language in religious, public and private inscriptions.

Methods of dating

It is often possible to date an inscription approximately by the style of the lettering, or even by the alphabet used. Thus at Athens the Ionic alphabet was adopted in place of the early Attic alphabet in the archonship of Eucleides, 403 BC, according to a decree proposed by Archinus. But the change was already in process in private inscriptions, and even in official documents Ionic forms are sometimes found earlier. Inscriptions are dated in various ways, mostly by giving the name of a king, magistrate or priest. In the case of kings, they only give an approximate date, unless the year of his reign is given also. But in the case of most independent cities, the date is given by the name of an annual magistrate, and thus the year is precisely indicated. At Athens, the name used was that of the Eponymous Archon, and as an almost complete list of these has been drawn up from inscriptions and other sources, this means of dating is quite satisfactory. The custom of dating by Olympiads, which is familiar to us from later Greek and Roman writers, was rarely used in early Greece, except in connection with athletic victories. Many inscriptions are dated from various local eras, often based upon historical events, such as the foundation of a town or festival, the organisation of a province, or even a visit of an emperor. The number of these eras in later times, especially in Asia Minor, becomes very bewildering. In Attic decrees, and some others, it was also usual to give the day of the month.

In Greek inscription of the Roman period the year of the emperor is defined by the number of his consulate, or other indications or titles, as in the corresponding Latin inscriptions. In later times, the dating is commonly by "Indiction"; but as this only gives the number of the year within the 15-year period, but leaves that period undefined, such dating is very inconvenient except for merely temporary use. In the Eastern Empire the date from the creation of the world (5509 BC) is sometimes given; but the date of the Christian era is hardly ever used.

Content

Purpose of inscriptions
Inscriptions may be roughly divided into two main classes: those in which the inscription was subservient to the use or purpose of the object on which it was inscribed, or at any rate had a direct relation to that object – for example, the name of the owner or the record of dedication to a god – and those in which the inscription existed independently for its own sake, or for the sake of the information which it recorded, and the object on which it was inscribed was either made for the purpose, as a slab of marble or plate of bronze, or was made use of, as in the case of a convenient wall or the surface of a rock, or even a potsherd. The walls of buildings are often covered with such inscriptions, especially if they are in a conspicuous or convenient position, and so offer an obvious means of publicity.

For us, accustomed as we are to a vast mass of books, newspapers and other printed or digital documents, it is difficult to realise the extensive use and great convenience assigned to inscriptions in ancient times. Not only were public announcements of all sorts, such as we should make known by advertisements or posters, thus placed before the public, but all kinds of records and enactments – codes of law and political decrees; regulations for all matters, civil and religious; accounts and contracts, public and private; treaties between states; records of public and private benefactions and dedications, and all matters of administration; honours to the living and to the memory of the dead. Many of these were intended to preserve for all time the records which they contained; but others must have been of only temporary interest. It seems, therefore, the more remarkable that they should have been incised on permanent material such as bronze, marble or stone – and incised in the first instance, with a care and perfection of technique which have led to their survival to the present day, so as to preserve for us invaluable evidence as to the life and institutions of the people who made them. Temporary and permanent value are therefore often combined in the same inscription. For instance, any Athenian citizen, visiting the Acropolis or the Agora, could satisfy themselves at first hand as to treaties or decrees of the people, public accounts or state income and expenditure. And at the same time these documents preserved for all time much history, both social and political.

Relative inscriptions

Inscriptions having a direct relation to the object, or representation, on which they are inscribed, vary greatly in their contents. Those relating to picture or relief chronicles of the victories or exploits of kings, as in Egypt and Mesopotamia, serve as a record of the events, and help to interpret the scenes. Such inscriptions are not common in Greek or Roman work; but frequently, especially in early Greek times, and on vases, the names of persons and even of objects are written beside them for the purpose of identification, and sometimes a speech issues from the mouth of the figure. On the carved wooden chest of Cypselus, of about 600 BC hexameter verses were written, curving about among figures, and giving a description of each scene. The bases of statues and reliefs often had inscriptions cut upon them for identification and record. This was particularly the case with honorary statues and tombstones. In other cases, where there is an evident relation between the artistic representation and the inscription, the figures are subordinate and seem merely to illustrate the text, as when a treaty between Athens and Samos has a relief at its head representing the goddess Athena and Hera clasping hands, as representatives of their respective cities. In other cases, the arms or device of a city is carved on an inscription, almost like a seal on a document. In all these cases the figures and the inscription are part of a common design, whether carried out by the same hand or not. But in the case of owners' marks or names cut on vases or other objects, or of the dedication of such objects, the inscription is not necessarily contemporary; it may indeed be misleading, as in the case, mentioned with disapproval by Cicero, of using again old Greek statues and placing new dedicatory inscriptions on them in Roman times, a sort of "recycling": for instance, one of the statues of Athenian knights of the 5th century BC placed at the entrance of the Acropolis, had a later inscription cut on its base to make it serve as an equestrian statue of Germanicus, probably in 18 AD when he visited Athens. In Egypt and Mesopotamia also it is not unusual to find the name of a later king of official cut upon an earlier work.

Independent inscriptions
The majority of inscriptions are of independent value and interest, the object on which they are cut being either provided for the purpose or utilised as convenient and suitable. Such inscriptions may be classified as Religious and Political and Social. The distinction between the two is not always easy to draw; for in almost all ancient civilisations religion was a part of the established service of the State, and was under public control, or at least was closely bound up with political administration. It follows that many inscriptions relating to religious matters take the form of political decrees or state documents, and therefore might, especially as far as form is concerned, be included in either category; but it is usually possible to classify them according to their contents and intention.

Greek inscriptions

Religious

Temples, their foundation and administration
A temple was often a kind of religious corporation under the control of the State; and its accounts and details of administration were made public at frequent intervals, usually annually, by means of inscriptions, exhibited to public view in its precinct. Many such inscriptions have been found, and supply a great deal of information that can be obtained from no other source. Some great temples, such as that of Apollo on the island of Delos, held great amounts of property, both real and portable, the latter taking the form either of more or less precious offerings dedicated in the temple and its surrounding buildings, or of coined money. The inscriptions accordingly record gifts and acquisitions of landed property, leases and assignments, payments of rent and fines for default, loans and interest and many other business transactions suitable to a great landed proprietor or to a bank. They therefore throw much light upon the social and economic conditions of ancient life, such as are nowhere else recorded. Again, the lists of offerings dedicated in the temple and other buildings enable us to realise almost visually the appearance of their contents. These are described as being on the floor, on the walls, on shelves or in cases; they consisted of vases and other objects suitable for use in the temple service; ornaments and jewels; statuettes, mostly in gold and silver; weapons and tools; coined money; and bullion, mostly melted down from old offerings. The detailed care that was taken in this last case, to ensure that the full weight of these objects was preserved, whether made into a new vessel or not, is recorded in other inscriptions. These elaborate inventories were checked and revised by each successive board of administrators, and gave the best possible security against any robbery or peculation. In addition to such general lists, there are also innumerable records of various gifts and acquisitions, whether of land and houses, or of movable property of all sorts. Buildings and repairs are also recorded, sometimes by the State, sometimes by individuals, whose piety and generosity are suitably honoured. In form, these are often hardly to be distinguished from public works of a secular character, which must be mentioned later.

The inscriptions on or belonging to special dedications are often of great historical interest – there need only be quoted the inscription on the famous Serpent Column, once at Delphi and now in the Hippodrome of Constantinople, with the list of the Greek States which took part in the Persian War; and that relating to the Roman arms dedicated by Pyrrhus of Epirus at Dodona after his victories. Most of the great temples being of immemorial sanctity, it is hardly to be expected that any records of their foundation should be found in inscriptions. But on the other hand we have many accounts of the dedication of new temples, either by states or communities or by private individuals. In almost all such cases it was necessary to obtain sanction for the foundation from the State; thus the inscription often takes the form of a decree of the people authorising the foundation of the temple and often giving some privileges to the founder or founders.

Priests and other officials

Inscriptions give much information as to priests and other religious officials. There are in the first place lists of priests, some of them covering long periods and even going back to mythical times; there are also lists of treasures and administrators, who were usually lay officials appointed for the purpose, either by election or by lot. The duties and privileges of priests are recorded in many inscriptions, and vary considerably from place to place. It is recorded, for instance, what portions of a victim at any sacrifice were to be received by the priest. In any important temple this must evidently have been far more than the priest or his family could consume, and accordingly it must have been sold, and so constituted a considerable source of income. Consequently, a priesthood was an office well paid and much sought after; and we actually find in later Greek times, especially in Asia Minor, that priesthoods were frequently sold, under proper guarantees and with due sureties as to the duties being carried out. Sometimes a fee to the priest had to be paid in cash; in some cases a priest or priestess was allowed to take up a collection on certain days. On the other hand, the duties of a priest are often recorded; he had to see to the cleaning and care of the temple and its contents, to provide flowers and garlands for decorations and to supply the regular daily service. Sacrifices on great occasions were usually provided by the State, as also were important repairs; but in some cases a priest undertook these on his own account, and was honoured accordingly – for instance, by being allowed to inscribe his name in the restored temple.

Besides priests, we find many other officials of various ranks attached to temples and recorded in inscriptions. Some of these, especially those who were concerned with buildings or constructions, or with the inventories of temple treasures and the accounts of administration, were lay officials appointed by the State, as in the case of political officers. But many others had specialised sacerdotal functions; for instance, in many places there were manteis or prophets, often of special families with hereditary skills in divination; at Eleusis we find records of the hierophant, the torch-bearer, and others who took part in the celebration of the mysteries. At Olympia, in later Greek times, we find a remarkable list of officials, that is: three priests, three libation pourers, two prophets, three custodians (of keys), a flute-player, an interpreter, a priest for the daily sacrifice, a secretary, a wine-pourer, three dancers at libations, a woodman (to supply wood for the sacrifices), and a steward and cook – the last no sinecure, in view of the numerous sacrificial feasts.

There were also many more menial offices in the service of temples which were carried out by slaves. Such slaves were often presented to the temple or acquired in some other way. There is a whole class of inscriptions, found on many sites, in which the sale of slaves to a temple or to the god of a temple is recorded. It is often difficult to know whether such slaves were intended for the service of a temple, or, on the other hand, such service was either purely formal or was not required at all, the sale to the temple being intended as fictitious, so as to enable a slave to acquire his own freedom and at the same time to secure the protection of the god in his free status.

Ritual

The ritual appropriate to different divinities and temples varied greatly from place to place; and it was, therefore, necessary or desirable to set up notices in all public places of worship for the information and guidance of worshippers. The commonest and most essential act of worship was sacrifice; an example of the simplest form of prescription is to be seen in the inscription on the relief from Thasos in the Louvre: "To the Nymphs and to Apollo the leader of the Nymphs, the worshipper may, if he so choose, sacrifice a male and a female victim. It is not permissible to offer a sheep or a pig. No paean is sung. To the Graces it is not permissible to offer a goat or a pig."

It is to be noticed that this order of service contains a prohibition as well as a prescription. Such prohibitions are frequent, and often relate to the need of ceremonial purity in all worshippers entering a sacred precinct. They must for a certain time have abstained from certain prescribed means of pollution, varying from place to place. The officials are sometimes ordered to erect notices giving information on this point; for instance, at the precinct of Alectrona at Ialysus, it was prescribed that "no horse, ass, mule, nor any other animal with a bushy tail should enter, and that nobody should bring such animals in or wear shoes or any article produced from pigs. There is also a fine for driving in sheep." Other precincts were protected in a more general manner from any invasion or violation. It was prohibited to cut wood or to remove earth and stones, or to drive any beasts into some precincts; the right of erecting booths was either restricted or denied altogether. Sometimes more detailed prescriptions are given for the whole organisation of a festival; thus, at Andania, in Messenia, the arrangements for the celebration of the local Eleusinia, the dress of the participants, the officials and policing, are very fully described. Similarly, in the Hall of the Iobacchi, at Athens, the order of proceedings, the officers and the characters in the sacred play, and various administrative details are ordered.

When there is any doubt about any ritual or procedure, divination is often resorted to, and the results of such divination are recorded in inscriptions as a guidance for the future; it was also a common practice to consult Delphi or some other oracle in doubtful or difficult cases; there the exact method of procedure is sometimes recorded, as well as the response of the oracle. Forms of worship are often prescribed or recorded, especially hymns, which are sometimes inscribed together with their musical notation. The performance of songs or hymns and dances are also matters of constant reference, especially in connection with lyrical or musical contests; the victorious band or performer often dedicated the prize in honour of the god. A special form of contest was that in dramatic performances, of which many records have survived, both from Athens and from many other parts of the Greek world. The regulation of athletic festivals, and the records of victors in their contests, also form a numerous class of inscriptions. As regards mysteries, though there are numerous regulations affecting the arrangement of celebrations and the conduct of those participating, there is, as was to be expected, very little concerning the actual performances.

Another interesting phase of Greek religion known to us mainly from inscriptions is offered by the shrines of healing. The most notable of these is the precinct of Asclepius at Epidaurus. Here have been found, on large slabs of inscription, compiled, in all probability, from earlier documents, lists of the cures effected by Apollo and Asclepius. The cures are of the most varied kinds, from painful diseases or surgical cases to a lost boy and a broken cup. The formula is in almost all cases the same: the consultant come to Epidaurus, sleeps in the abaton, has dreams or sees visions, and comes out whole. In later times, when such faith-healing had probably become less efficacious, elaborate prescriptions of diet and hygiene are recorded.

A special form of prayer consists of curses, which were often buried in the ground, probably with the intent to reach the infernal gods. Such curses often give the reason for their being made, usually some injury done to the author of the curse; sometimes they devote the offender to the infernal gods.

Private associations for religious purposes
Another elements in Greek religion which is known to us almost exclusively by means of inscriptions, is to be found in the religious associations that existed in many Greek cities, apart from the organisation of state religion, though sometimes recognised by it. These associations had each its own regulations, which were duly recorded in inscriptions; they varied greatly both in purpose and in character. Many of them had a definitely religious purpose, in the worship of certain gods; sometimes an alien community was given special permission to worship its own god or gods in its own way. Other associations were more social in character and served as clubs, or as burial societies. A remarkable feature about such associations is that the lists of members of many of them include the names of women and of slaves, thus contrasting with the civic basis of established religion in Greece, and anticipating a religion in which "there can be neither Jew nor Greek, there can be neither bond nor free, there can be no male and female."

Political and social

Codes of law and regulations
Ancient writers state that the earliest laws of Athens were inscribed upon tablets of wood, put together in a pyramidal shape. These, owing to their material, have perished; but we have some very early codes of law preserved on stone, notably at Gortyna in Crete. Here an inscription of great length is incised on the slabs of a theatre-shaped structure in 12 columns of 50 lines each; it is mainly concerned with the law of inheritance, adoption, etc. Doubtless similar inscriptions were set up in many places in Greece. An interesting series of inscriptions deals with the conditions under which colonists were sent out from various cities, and the measures that were taken to secure their rights as citizens. A bronze tablet records in some detail the arrangements of this sort made when Locrians established a colony in Naupactus; another inscription relates to the Athenian colonisation of Salamis, in the 6th century BC.

Decrees of people and rulers, later of kings and emperors
A very large number of inscriptions are in the form of decrees of various cities and peoples, even when their subject matter suggests that they should be classified under other headings. Almost all legislative and many administrative measures take this form; often a decree prescribes how and where the inscription should be set up. The formulae and preambles of such decrees vary considerably from place to place, and from period to period. Those of Athens are by far the most exactly known, owing to the immense number that have been discovered; and they are so strictly stereotyped that can be classified with the precision of algebraic formulae, and often dated to within a few years by this test alone. Very full lists for this purpose have been drawn up by epigraphist Wilhelm Larfeld, in his work on the subject. It is usual to record the year (by the name of the eponymous archon), the day of the month and of the prytany (or presiding commission according to tribes), various secretaries, the presiding officials and the proposer of the decree. It is also stated whether the resolution is passed by the senate (Boule) or the assembly of the people (Ecclesia), or both. The circumstances or the reason of the resolution are then given, and finally the decision itself. Some other cities followed Athens in the form of their decrees, with such local variations as were required; others were more independent in their development, and different magistracies or forms of government had various results. In the Hellenistic Age, and later, the forms of independent government were, to a great extent, kept up, though little real power remained with the people. On the other hand, it is common thing to find letters from kings, and later from Roman emperors, inscribed and set up in public places.

Public accounts, treasure lists, building inscriptions
It was customary to inscribe on stone all records of the receipt, custody and expenditure of public money or treasure, so that citizens could verify for themselves the safety and due control of the State in all financial matters. As in the case of temple accounts, it was usual for each temporary board of officials to render to their successors an account of their stewardship, and of the resources and treasures which they handed over. In all cases of public works, the expenditure was ordered by the State, and detailed reports were drawn up and inscribed on stone at intervals while the work was being carried out. In many cases there is a detailed specification of building work which makes it possible, not only to realise all the technical details and processes employed, but also the whole plan and structure of a building. A notable instance is the arsenal of Philon at the Peiraeus which has been completely reconstructed on paper by architects from the building specification. In the case of the Erechtheum, we have not only a detailed report on the unfinished state of the building in 409 BC, but also accounts of the expenditure and payments to the workmen employed in finishing it. Similar accounts have been preserved of the building of the Parthenon, spread over 15 years; in the case of both the Parthenon and the Erechtheum, there are included the payments made to those who made the sculptures.

Naval and military expenditure is also fully accounted for; among other information there are records of the galley-slips at the different harbours of the Piraeus, and of the ships of the Athenian navy, with their names and condition. In short, there is no department of state economy and financial administration that is not abundantly illustrated by the record of inscriptions. A set of records of high historical value are the "tribute lists", recording the quota paid to Athens by her subject allies during the 5th century BC. These throw much light on her relations with them at various periods.(Cf. Delian League).

Ephebic inscriptions
An institution as to which our knowledge is mainly derived from inscriptions is the ephebic system at Athens. There are not only records of lists of ephebi and of their guardians and instructors, but also decrees in honour of their services, especially in taking their due part in religious and other ceremonies, and resolutions of the ephebi themselves in honour of their officials. It is possible to trace in the inscriptions, which range over several centuries, how what was originally a system of physical and military training for Athenian youths from age of 18 to 20, with outpost and police duties, was gradually transformed. In later times there were added to the instructors in military exercises others who gave lectures on what we should now call arts and science subjects; so that in the Hellenistic and Roman times, when youths from all parts of the civilised world flocked to Athens as an intellectual centre, the ephebic system became a kind of cosmopolitan university.

Treaties and political and commercial agreements; arbitration, etc.
In addition to inscriptions which are concerned with the internal affairs of various cities, there are many others recording treaties or other agreements of an international character between various cities and states. These were incised on bronze or stone, and set up in places of public resort in the cities concerned, or in common religious centres such as Olympia and Delphi. The simplest form of treaty is merely an alliance for a certain term of years, usually with some penalty for any breach of the conditions. Often an oath was prescribed, to be taken by representatives on each side; it was also not unusual to appeal to the god in whose temple the treaty was exhibited. In other cases a list of gods by whom the two parties must swear is prescribed. Commercial clauses were sometimes added to treaties of alliance, and commercial treaties are also found, agreeing as to the export and import of merchandise and other things. In later days, especially in the time of the Hellenistic kings, treaties tend to become more complicated and detailed in their provisions.

Another series of records of great historical interest is concerned with arbitration between various states on various questions, mainly concerned with frontiers. In cases of dispute it was not uncommon for the two disputants to appoint a third party as arbitrator. Sometimes this third party was another State, sometimes a specified number of individuals. Thus, in a frontier dispute between Corinth and Epidaurus, 151 citizens of Megara were appointed by name to arbitrate, and when the decision was disputed, 31 from among them revised and confirmed it. In all such cases it was the custom for a full record to be preserved on stone and set up in the places concerned. In this case the initiative in referring the matter to arbitration came from the Achaean League.

Proxenia decrees
A very large class of inscriptions deals with the institution of proxenia. According to this a citizen of any State might be appointed proxenos of another State; his duties would then be to offer help and hospitality to any citizen of that other State who might be visiting his city, and to assist him in any dispute or in securing his legal rights. The office has been compared to the modern appointment of consuls, with the essential difference that the proxenos is always a citizen of the state in which he resides, not of that whose citizens and interests he assists. The decrees upon this matter frequently record the appointment of a proxenos, and the conferring on him of certain benefits and privileges in return for his services; they also contain resolutions of thanks from the city served by the proxenos, and record honours consequently conferred upon him.

Honours and privileges given to individuals
This class of inscription is in form not unlike the last, except that honours recorded are given for all sorts of services, private and public, to the State and to individuals. A frequent addition is an invitation to dine in the Prytaneum at Athens. Some are inscribed on the bases of statues set up to the recipient. In early times these inscriptions are usually brief and simple. The bust of Pericles on the Acropolis held nothing but the names of Pericles himself and of the sculptor Kresilas. Later it became usual to give, in some detail, the reasons for the honours awarded; and in Hellenistic and Roman times, these became more and more detailed and fulsome in laudatory detail.

Signatures of artists

These inscriptions are of special interest as throwing much light upon the history of art. The artist's name was usually, especially in earlier times, carved upon the base of the pedestal of a statue, and consequently was easily separated from it if the statue was carried off or destroyed. A case where both statue and pedestal are preserved is offered by the Victory, signed on its pedestal by Paeonius at Olympia. Occasionally, and more frequently in later times, the artist's signature was carved upon some portion of the statue itself. But in later copies of well-known works, it has to be considered whether the name is that of the original artist or of the copyist who reproduced his work. (see for example, the statue of Hercules/Heracles below)

A special class of artists' signatures is offered by the names signed by Attic and other vase painters upon their vases. These have been made the basis of a minute historical and stylistic study of the work of these painters, and unsigned vases also have been grouped with the signed ones, so as to make an exact and detailed record of this branch of Greek artistic production.

Historical records
The great majority of these fall into one of the classes already referred to. But there are some instances in which an inscription is set up merely as a record. For instance, a victor in athletic or other contests may set up a list of his victories. The most famous historical record is the autobiographical account of the deeds and administration of Augustus, which was reproduced and set up in many places; it is generally known as the Monumentum Ancyranum, because the most complete copy of it was found at Ancyra. The Marmor Parium at Oxford, found in Paros, is a chronological record of Greek history, probably made for educational purposes, and valuable as giving the traditional dates of events from the earliest time down.

Tombs and epitaphs
This is by far the most numerous class of inscriptions, both Greek and Latin. In early times there is often no record beyond the name of the deceased in Athens, often with the name of his father and his deme. Sometimes a word or two of conventional praise is added, such as "a good and wise man". Occasionally the circumstances of death are alluded to, especially if it took place in battle or at sea. Such epitaphs were frequently in metrical form, usually either hexameter or elegiacs. Many of them have been collected, and they form an interesting addition to the Greek anthology. In later times it becomes usual to give more elaborate praise of the deceased; but this is hardly ever so detailed and fulsome as on more modern tombstones. The age and other facts about the deceased are occasionally given, but not nearly so often as on Latin tombstones, which offer valuable statistical information in this respect.

Latin inscriptions

Latin inscriptions may be classified on much the same lines as Greek; but certain broad distinctions may be drawn at the outset. They are generally more standardised as to form and as to content, not only in Rome and Italy, but also throughout the provinces of the Roman Empire. One of the chief difficulties in deciphering Latin Inscriptions lies in the very extensive use of initials and abbreviations. These are of great number and variety, and while some of them can be easily interpreted as belonging to well-known formulae, others offer considerable difficulty, especially to the inexperienced student. Often the same initial may have many different meanings according to the context. Often the only way to determine the meaning is to search through a list of initials, such as those given by modern Latin epigraphists, until a formula is found which fits the context.

Most of what has been said about Greek inscriptions applies to Roman also. The commonest materials in this case also are stone, marble and bronze; but a more extensive use is made of stamped bricks and tiles, which are often of historical value as identifying and dating a building or other construction. The same applies to leaden water pipes which frequently bear dates and names of officials. Terracotta lamps also frequently have their makers' names and other information stamped upon them. Arms, and especially shields, sometimes bear the name and corps of their owners. Leaden discs were also used to serve the same purpose as modern identification discs. Inscriptions are also found on sling bullets – Roman as well as Greek; there are also numerous classes of tesserae or tickets of admission to theatres or other shows.

As regards the contents of inscriptions, there must evidently be a considerable difference between records of a number of independent city states and an empire including almost all the civilised world; but municipalities maintained much of their independent traditions in Roman times, and consequently their inscriptions often follow the old formulas.

The classification of Roman inscriptions may, therefore, follow the same lines as the Greek, except that certain categories are absent, and that some others, not found in Greek, are of considerable importance.

Religious

Dedications and foundations of temples, etc.

These are very numerous; and the custom of placing the name of the dedicator in a conspicuous place on the building was prevalent, especially in the case of dedications by emperors or officials, or by public bodies. Restoration or repair was often recorded in the same manner. Bequests made under the wills of rich citizens are frequently recorded by inscriptions; these might either be for religious or for social purposes.

Priests and officials
A priesthood was frequently a political office and consequently is mentioned along with political honours in the list of a man's distinctions. The priesthoods that a man had held are usually mentioned first in inscriptions before his civil offices and distinctions. Religious offices, as well as civil, were restricted to certain classes, the highest to those of senatorial rank, the next to those of equestrian status; many minor offices, both in Rome and in the provinces, are enumerated in their due order.

Regulations as to religion and cult
Among the most interesting of these is the ancient song and accompanying dance performed by the priests known as the Arval Brothers. This is, however, not in the form of a ritual prescription, but a detailed record of the due performance of the rite. An important class of documents is the series of calendars that have been found in Rome and in the various Italian towns. These give notice of religious festivals and anniversaries, and also of the days available for various purposes.

Colleges
The various colleges for religious purposes were very numerous. Many of them, both in Rome and Italy, and in provincial municipalities, were of the nature of priesthoods. The records of these colleges sometimes give no information beyond the names of members, but these are often of considerable interest. Haruspices and Luperci were of equestrian rank.

Political and social

Codes of law and regulations
Our information as to these is not mainly drawn from inscriptions and, therefore, they need not here be considered. On the other hand, the word  (law) is usually applied to all decrees of the senate or other bodies, whether of legislative or of administrative character. It is therefore, best to consider all together under the heading of public decrees.

Laws and plebiscites, senatus consulta, decrees of magistrates or later of emperors
A certain number of these dating from republican times are of considerable interest. One of the earliest relates to the prohibition of bacchanalian orgies in Italy; it takes the form of a message from the magistrates, stating the authority on which they acted. Laws all follow a fixed formula, according to the body which has passed them. First there is a statement that the legislative body was consulted by the appropriate magistrate in due form; then follows the text of the law; and finally the sanction, the statement that the law was passed. In decrees of the senate the formula differs somewhat. C. is added at the end, to indicate that the decree was passed. In imperial times, the emperor sometimes addressed a speech to the senate, advising them to pass certain resolutions, or else, especially in later times, gave orders or instructions directly, either on his own initiative or in response to questions or references. The number and variety of such orders is such that no classification of them can be given here. One of the most famous is the edict of Diocletian, fixing the prices of all commodities. Copies of this in Greek as well as in Latin have been found in various parts of the Roman Empire.

Records of buildings, etc.

A very large number of inscriptions record the construction or repair of public buildings by private individuals, by magistrates, Roman or provincial, and by emperors. In addition to the dedication of temples, we find inscriptions recording the construction of aqueducts, roads, especially on milestones, baths, basilicas, porticos and many other works of public utility. In inscriptions of early period often nothing is given but the name of the person who built or restored the edifice and a statement that he had done so. But later it was usual to give more detail as to the motive of the building, the name of the emperor or a magistrate giving the date, the authority for the building and the names and distinctions of the builders; then follows a description of the building, the source of the expenditure (e.g.) and finally the appropriate verb for the work done, whether building, restoring, enlarging or otherwise improving. Other details are sometimes added, such as the name of the man under whose direction the work was done.

Military documents

These vary greatly in content, and are among the most important documents concerning the administration of the Roman Empire. "They are numerous and of all sorts – tombstones of every degree, lists of soldiers' burial clubs, certificates of discharge from service, schedules of time-expired men, dedications of altars, records of building or of engineering works accomplished. The facts directly commemorated are rarely important." But when the information from hundreds of such inscriptions is collected together, "you can trace the whole policy of the Imperial Government in the matter of recruiting, to what extent and till what date legionaries were raised in Italy; what contingents for various branches of the service were drawn from the provinces, and which provinces provided most; how far provincials garrisoned their own countries, and which of them, like the British recruits, were sent as a measure of precaution to serve elsewhere; or, finally, at what epoch the empire grew weak enough to require the enlistment of barbarians from beyond its frontiers."

Treaties and agreements
There were many treaties between Rome and other states in republican times; but we do not, as a rule, owe our knowledge of these to inscriptions, which are very rare in this earlier period. In imperial times, to which most Latin inscriptions belong, international relations were subject to the universal domination of Rome, and consequently the documents relating to them are concerned with reference to the central authority, and often take the form of orders from the emperor.

Proxeny

This custom belonged to Greece. What most nearly corresponded to it in Roman times was the adoption of some distinguished Roman as its patron, by a city or state. The relation was then recorded, usually on a bronze tablet placed in some conspicuous position in the town concerned. The patron probably also kept a copy in his house, or had a portable tablet which would ensure his recognition and reception.

Honorary
Honorary inscriptions are extremely common in all parts of the Roman world. Sometimes they are placed on the bases of statues, sometimes in documents set up to record some particular benefaction or the construction of some public work. The offices held by the person commemorated, and the distinctions conferred upon him are enumerated in a regularly established order, either beginning with the lower and proceeding step by step to the higher, or in reverse order with the highest first. Religious and priestly offices are usually mentioned before civil and political ones. These might be exercised either in Rome itself, or in the various municipalities of the empire. There was also a distinction drawn between offices that might be held only by persons of senatorial rank, those that were assigned to persons of equestrian rank, and those of a less distinguished kind. It follows that when only a portion of an inscription has been found, it is often possible to restore the whole in accordance with the accepted order.

Signatures of artists
When these are attached to statues, it is sometimes doubtful whether the name is that of the man who actually made the statue, or of the master whose work it reproduces. Thus there are two well-known copies of a statue of Hercules by Lysippus, of which one is said to be the work of Lysippus, and the other states that it was made by Glycon (see images). Another kind of artist's or artificer's signature that is commoner in Roman times is to be found in the signatures of potters upon lamps and various kinds of vessels; they are usually impressed on the mould and stand out in relief on the terracotta or other material. These are of interest as giving much information as to the commercial spread of various kinds of handicrafts, and also as to the conditions under which they were manufactured.

Historical records
Many of these inscriptions might well be assigned to one of the categories already considered. But there are some which were expressly made to commemorate an important event, or to preserve a record. A document of high importance is a summary of the life and achievements of Augustus, already mentioned, and known as the Monumentum Ancyranum. The various sets of Fasti constituted a record of the names of consuls, and other magistrates or high officials, and also of the triumphs accorded to conquering generals.

Inscriptions on tombs

These are probably the most numerous of all classes of inscriptions; and though many of them are of no great individual interest, they convey, when taken collectively, much valuable information as to the distribution and transference of population, as to trades and professions, as to health and longevity, and as to many other conditions of ancient life. The most interesting early series is that on the tombs of the Scipios at Rome, recording, mostly in Saturnian Metre, the exploits and distinctions of the various members of that family.

These are followed by the name of the deceased, usually with his father's name and his tribe, by his honours and distinctions, sometimes by a record of his age. The person who has erected the monument and his relation to the deceased are often stated; or if a man has prepared the tomb in his lifetime, this also may be stated, . But there is an immense variety in the information that either a man himself or his friend may wish to record.

Milestones and boundaries
Milestones have already been referred to, and may be regarded as records of the building of roads. Boundary stones are frequently found, both of public and private property. A well-known instance is offered by those set up by the commissioners called  in the time of the Gracchi.

See also

Related fields of study

 EpiDoc
 Leiden Conventions
 Numismatics
 Palaeography, the study of ancient writing

 Orthography
 Papyrology
 Typography
 Writing system

Types of inscription

Abecedarium
Chronogram
 Corpus Inscriptionum Latinarum
Copper plate inscriptions
Arabic
Ex libris
Early Indian epigraphy
Epitaph on a headstone
Graffiti
Hero stone and Paliya
History of Latin
Inscriptiones Graecae and Supplementum Epigraphicum Graecum
Maya script, also known as "Maya glyphs" or "Maya hieroglyphics"
Memento mori

Monumental inscription
Ogham
Ogham inscription
Kannada inscriptions
Old Turkic script
Ostracon
Petroglyph
Pre-Islamic Arabic inscriptions
Roman lead pipe inscription
Runestone
Stoichedon
Tamil-Brahmi

Notable inscriptions

 Behistun Inscription
 Bitola inscription
 Bryggen inscriptions
 Decree of Themistocles
 Dipylon inscription
 Duenos Inscription
 Edicts of Ashoka
 Inscription of Abercius
 Kedukan Bukit
 Laguna Copperplate Inscription
 La Mojarra Stela 1
 Malia altar stone
 Phaistos Disc
 Res Gestae Divi Augusti
 Rosetta Stone
 Shugborough inscription
Priene Inscription
Punic-Libyan Inscription
 The Antikythera mechanism is notable for the novel techniques used in reading the inscriptions.

References

External links

 
 
 
 
 
 
 
 
 
 
 
 
 
 
 
 Poinikastas: Epigraphic Sources For Early Greek Writing, Oxford University
 Current Epigraphy a journal of news and short reports on inscriptions
 The Epigraphic Society Formed in 1974 by Professor Barry Fell of Harvard University and Professor Norman Totten of Bentley College, its journal, the Epigraphic Society Occasional Papers (ESOP), is shelved by numerous universities and research institutions worldwide.
 Signs of Life a Virtual Exhibition on Epigraphy, presenting several aspects of it with examples.
 

 
Textual scholarship
Inscriptions